was the third of ten s built for the Imperial Japanese Navy in the mid-1930s under the Circle Two Supplementary Naval Expansion Program (Maru Ni Keikaku).

History
The Asashio-class destroyers were larger and more capable that the preceding , as Japanese naval architects were no longer constrained by the provisions of the London Naval Treaty. These light cruiser-sized vessels were designed to take advantage of Japan’s lead in torpedo technology, and to accompany the Japanese main striking force and in both day and night attacks against the United States Navy as it advanced across the Pacific Ocean, according to Japanese naval strategic projections. Despite being one of the most powerful classes of destroyers in the world at the time of their completion, none survived the Pacific War.

Michishio, built at the Fujinagata Shipyards in Osaka was laid down on 5 November 1935, launched on 15 March 1937 and commissioned on 31 October 1937.

Operational history
On commissioning, Michishio was assigned to support Japanese combat operations in the Second Sino-Japanese War from November to December 1937. However, following reports of operational problems with her sister ship , she was withdrawn to Sasebo Naval Arsenal for modifications and replacement of her engines.

At the time of the attack on Pearl Harbor, Michishio was assigned to Destroyer Division 8 (Desdiv 8), and a member of Destroyer Squadron 2 (Desron 2) of the IJN 2nd Fleet, escorting Admiral Nobutake Kondō's Southern Force Main Body out of Mako Guard District as distant cover to the Malaya and Philippines invasion forces in December 1941.

Michishio escorted a troop convoy from Mako towards Singora, then put into Hong Kong on 5 January 1942. She escorted another troop convoy to Davao, and then accompanied the Ambon invasion force (31 January), the Makassar invasion force (8 February ) and the Bali/Lombok invasion force (18 February).

On the night of 19 February, Michishio participated in the Battle of Badoeng Strait. Michishio was guarding the transport Sagami Maru off Bali when an Allied fleet attacked. Michishio was caught in crossfire by four United States Navy destroyers and severely damaged, with 13 crewmen dead and 83 injured. She was towed by the destroyer  to Makassar for repairs.

In March, after emergency repairs at Makassar, Michishio returned to Yokosuka Naval Arsenal for further repairs, which lasted to the end of October. Returning to active duty at Rabaul at the end of October, Michishio was assigned to three "Tokyo Express" transport runs in early November. During the Naval Battle of Guadalcanal on 14 November, she was damaged by United States Navy aircraft, and had to be towed to Shortland Island for repairs. However, field repairs proved impossible, and she was towed to Rabaul, then to Truk, and finally to Yokosuka, arriving on 17 March 1943. 
Michishio remained under repair at Yokosuka Naval Arsenal to 14 November, during which time one of her main gun turrets was replaced by two triple Type 96 AA guns.

In January 1944, Michishio returned to Kure Naval District together with the battleship ,  and escorted a troop convoy back to Truk at the end of that month. For the end two months, she served largely as escort for the battleship 

During the Battle of the Philippine Sea, Michishio was in Admiral Takatsugu Jōjima's “Force B”, but did not see combat during that battle. Afterwards, she assisted the torpedoed tanker Itsukushima Maru at Negros Island, and escorted the battleship  from Davao to Kure. She accompanied the battleship  in August from Sasebo to Singapore and then escorted supply convoys to Brunei.

During the Battle of Surigao Strait, Michishio was in Admiral Shōji Nishimura's Southern Force. Michishio was removed from the navy list on 10 January 1945.

Rediscovery
Michishio's wreck was discovered along with sister Yamagumo on 27 November 2017 by Microsoft co-founder Paul Allen's research ship RV Petrel. The wrecks are 1 mile (1.6 km) apart in 380 ft (117 m) of water. Both wrecks are heavily encrusted with marine growth which, combined with their close proximity, made it impossible to distinguish the two.

Notes

References

External links
  CombinedFleet.com: Asashio-class destroyers
  CombinedFleet.com: Michishio history
 GlobalSecurity.org: Asashio class destroyers
 Materials of the Imperial Japanese Navy

Asashio-class destroyers
Second Sino-Japanese War naval ships of Japan
World War II destroyers of Japan
1937 ships
Maritime incidents in October 1944
World War II shipwrecks in the Philippine Sea
Shipwreck discoveries by Paul Allen
Ships built by Fujinagata Shipyards
2017 archaeological discoveries